Keith Newell may refer to:

 Keith Newell (cricketer) (born 1972), English cricketer
 Keith Newell (American football) (born 1988), American football offensive lineman